The American Apollo (January 6, 1792 - December 25, 1794) was a newspaper published in Boston, Massachusetts in the late 18th century, featuring "political and commercial intelligence, and other entertaining matter." It was issued by printer Joseph Belknap, along with Alexander Young (as "Belknap & Young," January–May 1792) and Thomas Hall (as "Belknap & Hall," May 1792-July 1794) on State Street. In 1792, the newly formed Massachusetts Historical Society's "collections were at first published in ... the American Apollo. " The newspaper ceased in December 1794.

References

Further reading

 J.T. Buckingham. Specimens of Newspaper Literature: with Personal Memoirs, Anecdotes, and Reminiscences. Boston: Redding & Co., 1852; p. 147+
 Clarence Brigham. "Bibliography of American Newspapers, 1690-1820 Part III: Maryland to Massachusetts(Boston)" Proceedings of the American Antiquarian Society April 1915; p. 193-194.

Newspapers published in Boston
Publications established in 1792
Publications disestablished in 1794
Defunct newspapers published in Massachusetts
18th century in Boston
Financial District, Boston
1792 establishments in Massachusetts
1794 disestablishments in Massachusetts